Magotha is an unincorporated community in Northampton County, Virginia, United States known mostly for poultry and small chicken farming.

References
GNIS reference

Unincorporated communities in Virginia
Unincorporated communities in Northampton County, Virginia